Chaetasteridae is a family of echinoderms belonging to the order Valvatida.

Genera:
 Chaetaster Müller & Troschel, 1840
 Chaetasterina Hess, 1970

References

Valvatida
Echinoderm families